The 1947 Liège–Bastogne–Liège was the 33rd edition of the Liège–Bastogne–Liège cycle race and was held on 20 April 1947. The race started and finished in Liège. The race was won by Richard Depoorter of the Garin–Wolber team.

General classification

References

1947
1947 in Belgian sport